Emmanuel Agyemang-Badu (born 2 December 1990), known mononymously as Badu, is a Ghanaian professional footballer who plays as a midfielder for Accra Great Olympics. He has earned 78 caps for the Ghana national team.

Club career

Early career
Born in Berekum, Brong-Ahafo, Badu began his career at local club Berlin F.C. before later signing for Berekum Arsenal. Badu was announced in the Ghana Premier League All Star Team on 21 May 2007.

On 11 July 2008, Badu left Berekum Arsenal, signing a one-year loan contract with Asante Kotoko.

Badu had trials in England with Middlesbrough in August 2008 and at Wolverhampton Wanderers three months later.

Badu then signed on 16 April 2009 a six-month loan contract with Recreativo de Huelva, on loan from Berlin FC. Reuters quoted a source from a Berlin FC official, that the loan cost Recreativo about €30,000 (US$40,000), while Associated Press reported his new club holds an option for a contract between 30 June 2012 and the loan would be effective until the opening of 2009 summer transfer window. His contract with the Spanish club Recreativo de Huelva was dissolved in September 2009 and he moved back to Asante Kotoko.

Udinese
In November 2009, BBC and Sky Sports announced the Italian Serie A side Udinese Calcio would sign Badu in January 2010 and on 28 January 2010, the Udine club announced on its official site the permanent signing of the player from Berlin FC. Badu received his first first team call-up against A.C. Milan on 12 February, but did not play. After a successive "appearances" as unused sub, he replaced Paolo Sammarco on 28 March 2010 against Fiorentina, which Udinese lost 1–4.

Badu became a regular in 2011–12 season, replacing departed Gökhan İnler in new 4–1–4–1 or 4–4–1–1 formation against Arsenal. Badu was one of the cover of attacking midfielder Giampiero Pinzi along with countryman Kwadwo Asamoah.

In August 2017 he joined Turkish Süper Lig club Bursaspor on loan for the 2017–18 season. He was injured whilst on loan, and returned to first-team action with Udinese in March 2019, after 11 months out.

Verona
On 13 July 2019, Badu signed to Hellas Verona on loan with an obligation to buy. He was hospitalised in August with blood clots on his lungs, but was cleared to play in December 2019. He featured in 10 matches on loan at the club.

After the 2019–20 season Hellas Verona activated their obligation to sign him on a two-year deal from Udinese after playing for the Udine-based club for 10 years and playing in 193 matches in all competitions, scoring 10 times and making 11 assists. He was not included in Verona's 2020–21 Serie A squad. On 2 January 2021, he announced that he terminated his Verona contract and retired from playing.

Great Olympics 
In July 2022, 13 years after playing in the Ghana Premier League, Badu made a return to the league and signed for Nungua-based club Accra Great Olympics as a free agent. He signed a one-year deal with the club ahead of the 2022–23 season. He made his debut on 17 August 2022 against Bechem United, in a 5–4 penalties loss after a goalless draw in regulation time in the 2022 GHALCA G6.

He played in all matches as Olympics went on to win the GHALCA G6 at the end of the tournament after defeating Bechem United by 2–0 in the final. On 9 September 2022, a day to the commencement of the league, he was officially unveiled by the club.

International career

Badu has represented Ghana at under-20, under-23 and senior level. On 22 May 2008, he received his first call-up to the Black Stars. Badu's first senior international appearance came on 8 June 2008 against Lesotho and his first goal against Congo in June 2011.

Youth career
On 1 January 2009, he was named in the Black Satellites squad for the 2009 African Youth Championship in Rwanda. Badu played for the Black Stars' domestic based team at the 2009 African Championship of Nations in Côte d'Ivoire and represented his team at 2009 FIFA U-20 World Cup in Egypt.

Badu scored the winning sudden death penalty on 16 October 2009 in the 2009 FIFA U-20 World Cup Final against Brazil. The penalty made Ghana the first African nation to win the FIFA U-20 World Cup.

Senior career
In 2010, Badu was selected for his first Africa Cup of Nations as the Black Stars finished runners-up to Egypt, and went on to appear in the 2012 and 2013 editions of the tournament, with the team twice recording fourth-placed finishes.

During the 2012 Africa Cup of Nations, in a group match between Ghana and Guinea, Badu flipped up a teammate's pass from just outside the penalty area and launched a mid-air volley to score a goal that was later nominated for the 2012 FIFA Puskás Award (FIFA's global Goal of the Year award).

After missing the 2010 FIFA World Cup through injury, Badu was selected in Ghana's squad for the 2014 tournament.

Personal life
Emmanuel Agyeman-Badu hails from Seikwa, Bono Region of the Republic of Ghana.
His brother Nana Agyemang-Badu plays for Asante Kotoko. Badu is the nephew of Asiedu Nketia.

Career statistics

International

International goals
Score and Result list Ghana's goal tally first

|-
| 1. || 3 June 2011 || Baba Yara Stadium, Kumasi, Ghana ||  ||  ||  || 2012 Africa Cup of Nations qualification || 
|-
| 2. || 2 September 2011 || Accra Sports Stadium, Accra, Ghana ||  ||  ||  || 2012 Africa Cup of Nations qualification || 
|-
| 3. || 15 November 2011 || Stade Municipal, Saint-Leu-la-Forêt, France ||  ||  ||  || Friendly || 
|-
| 4. || 1 February 2012 || Stade de Franceville, Franceville, Gabon ||  ||  ||  || 2012 Africa Cup of Nations || 
|-
| 5. || 10 January 2013 || Mohammed Bin Zayed Stadium, Abu Dhabi, United Arab Emirates ||  ||  ||  || Friendly || 
|-
| 6. || 20 January 2013 || Nelson Mandela Bay Stadium, Port Elizabeth, South Africa ||  ||  ||  || 2013 Africa Cup of Nations || 
|-
| 7. || 24 March 2013 || Baba Yara Stadium, Kumasi, Ghana ||  ||  ||  || 2014 FIFA World Cup qualification || 
|-
| 8. || 10 September 2014 || Stade de Kégué, Lomé, Togo ||  ||  ||  || 2015 Africa Cup of Nations qualification || 
|-
| 9. || 15 October 2014 || Accra Sports Stadium, Accra, Ghana ||  ||  ||  || 2015 Africa Cup of Nations qualification || 
|-
| 10. || 31 March 2015 || Stade Sébastien Charléty, Paris, France ||  ||  ||  || Friendly || 
|}

Honours
Asante Kotoko
 Ghana Premier League: 2007–2008
Great Olympics

 GHALCA G6: 2022

Ghana U-20
 African Youth Championship: 2009
 FIFA U-20 World Cup: 2009

Ghana 
 Africa Cup of Nations Silver Medal: 2010, 2015

References

External links

1990 births
People from Berekum
Living people
Ghanaian footballers
Ghana international footballers
Ghana under-20 international footballers
Association football utility players
Association football defenders
Association football midfielders
Berekum Arsenal players
Asante Kotoko S.C. players
Recreativo de Huelva players
Udinese Calcio players
Bursaspor footballers
Hellas Verona F.C. players
La Liga players
Serie A players
Süper Lig players
2010 Africa Cup of Nations players
2012 Africa Cup of Nations players
2013 Africa Cup of Nations players
2014 FIFA World Cup players
2015 Africa Cup of Nations players
2017 Africa Cup of Nations players
Expatriate footballers in Spain
Expatriate footballers in Italy
Ghanaian expatriate footballers
Ghanaian expatriate sportspeople in Italy